Mohammad Aliabad (also Romanized as Moḩammad ‘Alīābād) is a village in Cheshmeh Saran Rural District, Cheshmeh Saran District, Azadshahr County, Golestan Province, Iran. At the 2006 census, its population was 566, in 131 families.

References 

Populated places in Azadshahr County